Incourt is a municipality of Wallonia located in the Belgian province of Walloon Brabant. On January 1, 2006, Incourt had a total population of 4,585. The total area is 38.79 km² which gives a population density of 118 inhabitants per km².

The municipality contains, besides Incourt itself, the sections of Glimes, Opprebais, Piétrebais, Sart-Risbart and Roux-Miroir.

References

External links
 

 
Municipalities of Walloon Brabant